The Monks, referred to by the name monks on record sleeves, were an American garage rock band formed in Gelnhausen, West Germany in 1964. Assembled by five American GIs stationed in the country, the group grew tired of the traditional format of rock, which motivated them to forge a highly experimental style characterized by an emphasis on hypnotic rhythms that minimized the role of melody, augmented by the use of sound manipulation techniques. The band's unconventional blend of shrill vocals, confrontational lyrics, feedback, and guitarist David Day's six-string banjo baffled audiences, but music historians have since identified the Monks as a pioneering force in avant-garde music. The band's lyrics often voiced objection to the Vietnam War and the dehumanized state of society, while prefiguring the harsh and blunt commentary of the punk rock movement of the 1970s and 1980s. The band's appearance was considered as shocking as its music, as they attempted to mimic the look of Catholic monks by wearing black habits with cinctures symbolically tied around their necks, and hair worn in partially shaved tonsures.

In late 1964, while known as the Torquays, the band issued the self-financed single "There She Walks"; however, the release barely hinted at the music the group would record the following year. With the help of a German management team, they decided to change their name to the Monks and released the "Complication" single to coincide with the distribution of their one and only studio album, Black Monk Time on Polydor Records, in March 1966. Though the album and additional singles issued throughout 1966 and 1967 achieved limited success at the time, they have become highly regarded amongst music enthusiasts and commentators.

A few days after the release of Five Upstart Americans in 1999, all five of the original band members held a reunion concert followed by other series of sporadic tours in the 2000s. The band has acquired a cult following as a result of the newfound interest in Black Monk Time, and appearances on several compilation albums, most notably the expanded version of Nuggets: Original Artyfacts from the First Psychedelic Era, 1965–1968. Punk bands and acts of other genres from the 1980s and 1990s, such as the Dead Kennedys and the Beastie Boys, have credited the Monks as an influence on their own musical styles.

History

Beginnings (1963–1964)

The nucleus of the Monks formed in late 1963, when American G.I.s Gary Burger (lead guitar, lead vocalist), Larry Clark (keyboards), Eddie Shaw (bass guitar), and Dave Day (rhythm guitar), along with a West German civilian identified simply as Hans (drums) came together as a quintet known as the Torquays, a name inspired by Burger's admiration for the Fireballs' hit instrumental piece "Torquay". Burger and Day had previously spent time together informally performing as an on-duty musical duo called the Rhythm Rockers, which soon recruited Clark and Hans to bolster their sound. Soon after, Shaw auditioned for the band and was reluctantly accepted by Burger. Shaw, a jazz musician by trade, was recruited largely due to the band's urgent need for a bass guitarist, rather than for his experience with the instrument, which was limited to some private practices prior to meeting with the Torquays. The band first began performing at military hangouts near their outpost in Gelhausen, playing a combination of American rock and roll standards from the 1950s, and some original songs penned by Burger and Day to rowdy crowds and servicemen.

Spotting the band at the Maxim Club, talent manager Hans Reich convinced the Torquays to stay in Germany when their military careers came to a close with the promise of work. For a brief period, the band included vocalist Zack Zachariah and drummer Bob Rose; however, the two were forced to excuse themselves from the Torquays because their discharges were long after the other band members'. Burger solved the issue relatively quickly by introducing the band to drummer Roger Johnston, and, henceforth, solidifying the line-up which would exist for the duration of the group's recording career. As the Torquays began to rehearse, Burger arranged a one-off single deal for the group at an independent studio in Heidelberg. The single, which coupled the band originals "There She Walks" and "Boys Are Boys", had 500 copies produced in late 1964, which were sold by Clark at live performances. Recordings from the single were later collected on the compilation album Five Upstart Americans.

In early 1965, the Torquays began a residency at the Rio Bar in Stuttgart, where they utilized the space to experiment with electronics and sound manipulation, while also expanding their repertoire. It was during the rehearsals at the Rio Bar that the group's avant-garde style—a combination of abrasive waves of feedback and high-volume distortion—began to emerge in its primitive form. Sensing a potential to expand upon their sound, a German management team, composed of Carl Remy, Walter Niemann, Gunther and Kiki Neumann, signed the Torquays to promote an entirely new image and hone their ensemble playing. During one of the first sessions with the team, the band decided to rename themselves the Monks, a moniker that was initially met with some misgivings by Clark whose father was a priest.

Experimentation and album (1965–1966)
Under the supervision of the management team, the Monks conducted extensive rehearsals with a focus on gritty, rhythmically oriented music. The band equipped themselves with new instruments and hardware to achieve that goal: a Maestro fuzz box (and eventually a wah-wah pedal) for Burger, a floor tom for Johnston, and a six-string banjo for Day, the latter of which offered a disorienting counter-rhythm to the bass section. Shaw explained that the group's motivation was to possess "high rhythm and high energy". He elaborated further, saying "The idea of it was to get as much 'beat' out of it as we could. As much 'bam-bam-bam-bam' on the beat or whatever. The only time cymbals would be used would be for accent. If anyone wasn't contributing towards rhythm, then it wasn't part of the Monks sound". However, the band's transformation into the Monks was painstakingly slow, taking the group nearly a year of trial-and-error before they were confident enough to return to the studio.

In September 1965, the Monks recorded new, self-penned compositions to present to Polydor Records. However, Polydor was reluctant to sign the band to a recording contract until they performed at the Top Ten Club in Hamburg, where the Beatles garnered attention three years earlier. Much was made at the time of the Monks' unconventional attire, with their tailored-made black robes strikingly at odds with the prevailing trend for uniformity among contemporary beat groups. With all five members abandoning their Beatlesque hairdos for tonsures and plain rope serving as ties, the band exuded a mysterious aura, while also looking menacingly non-conformist. The Monks' image was met with mixed attitudes from their audiences. Younger fans were playfully curious about the band's eccentric appearance, but conservative patrons were shocked and, at times, furious at what they considered blasphemy on part of the group. Another aspect of the band was their relative detachment from the crowd, compounded by a loud and dissonant "steamroller of sound" that was intended to challenge but not necessarily please audiences.

Polydor Records was willing to gamble on the Monks' radical approach, and the band entered a studio in Cologne in November 1965. The recording sessions for the album, titled Black Monk Time brought the band to the edge of exhaustion, as they had to juggle nightly performances alongside Bill Haley and His Comets with early morning work in the studio.  Another challenge was record producer Jimmy Bowien's limited resources to properly record the Monks' loud acoustics on a crude four-track tape. To avoid jumbling the instrumentals, the band members had to play behind sound walls in separate corners of the studio room.

In March 1966, Polydor Records released Black Monk Time and the "Complication" single. The striking approach that the Monks had taken on rock music was a precursor of punk rock. Burger's bursts of disorienting feedback was played through a heavily modified Vox Super Beatle amplifier. The songs strayed far from the typical verse-chorus-bridge, but their emphasis on rhythm was nonetheless reminiscent of R&B music acts of the 1950s. Lyrically, Black Monk Time showcased hard-edge and paranoiac political commentary about the Vietnam War, love-hate relationships, and demonized society for its imperfections. Polydor did not release the album in the United States considering it "too radical and non-commercial" it was circulated on tape in the 1980s and had developed a cult following by the early 1990s. The band itself re-released the album (first time in the US) in 1994.

Changing musical direction (1966–1967)

The release of Black Monk Time was followed by press events, photo shoots with Charles Paul Wilp, and a six-month tour of one-nighters in music halls and bar taverns across West Germany, orchestrated by the newest member of their promotional team, Wolfgang Gluszczewski. Unfortunately, the tour was debilitating for the Monks, and their music often alienated new audiences attempting to catch on with the latest Monk craze. With the album underachieving in sales, Bowien urged the group to capitalize on the popularity of "soft wave" music, particularly the Beatles' song "Yellow Submarine". Although the majority of the band resisted the idea in favor of protecting their image, Day utilized the opportunity to introduce his love song, "Cuckoo", to the rest of the Monks.  When the band returned to Hamburg for their second residency at the Top Ten Club, they recorded "Cuckoo" along with "I Can't Get Over You".

Soon after the release of "Cuckoo", the band promoted the single on the television program Beat-Club, and several radio stations, resulting in the record charting in some German markets. In particular, the Monks' music was appreciated by citizens in East Germany that heard the group on Radio Luxembourg, evident by the flow of fan mail arriving over the Iron Curtain. Shaw speculated the band's themes and idea of individualism were more accessible to Eastern Germans who were unable to express the same kind of individuality. Writer Mike Stax has noted that after the initial burst of publicity for "Cuckoo" subsided, the group had exhausted all outlets on the German music market, and by late 1966 the Monks were looking to expand to other countries. The band took their act on a two-week tour to Sweden, receiving positive reviews, which concluded with an appearance on Swedish National Television.

Upon their return to Germany in February 1967, the Monks learned the news that Polydor Records refused to distribute Black Monk Time in the United States because of the cynical nature of the tracks referring to the Vietnam War.  At Carl Remy's recommendation, the Monks were scheduled to tour in Vietnam, and persuaded to incorporate subtle psychedelic rock influences into their third single, under the expectation that it could theoretically expand the Monks' dwindling audience. Additionally, the management team reiterated its ultimate goal of releasing two more albums called Silver Monk Time and Gold Monk Time to boost the group's deflated egos.

Following Remy's request, the band made tentative moves to change their sound on the single "Love Can Tame the Wild" backed by "He Went Down to the Sea". Gone was Day's signature electric banjo, Burger's frantic vocals, and Spangler's keyboards, replaced by a rhythm guitar, subdued singing, and calculated orchestration which featured Clark on piano and Shaw on trumpet. Monk historian Will Bedard described the single "as uninspired as the LP was revolutionary". While performing with the Jimi Hendrix Experience in May 1967, there was increasing tension among the members of the group. Day became increasingly irritated by the added covers to the band's live set, and Burger and Johnston abandoned the Monk image in favor of colorful clothing, to the annoyance of their bandmates. Despite the Monks' inner turmoil, the band was still arranged to depart for Vietnam from Frankfurt airport; however, just a day before the flight, Burger informed the band Clark had returned to his hometown in Texas. Johnston, who had read about Buddhist monks that immolated themselves by fire, irrationally believed the Monks would meet a similar fate at the hands of the Viet Cong. Without a suitable replacement drummer, the group disbanded in September 1967.

Reunions
In November 1999, to coincide with the release of Five Upstart Americans, the Monks, along with vocalist Mike Fornatale, reformed to headline Cavestomp in New York City, an annual event that resurrected garage bands of the 1960s. The three-day function also featured the Chocolate Watchband and the Standells, and marked the Monks' first performance in the United States—32 years after the group disbanded. Critic Jon Pareles of the New York Times wrote Burger could no longer reach the high-falsetto parts, but "otherwise they were untouched by time or fashion". On October 31, 2000, tapes of the concert were released on the live album Let's Start a Beat – Live from Cavestomp.

The original Monks line-up performed together for the last time at the Rockaround event in Las Vegas, in 2004. Later in the year, Johnston died in November after a lengthy battle with lung cancer. A further set of reunions took place in England and Germany in 2006 and 2007 before the Monks officially disbanded. On January 10, 2008, Day died from a massive heart attack at the age of 66. Burger began a solo career thereafter, performing mostly with the Monks' repertoire until 2009. In 2014, Burger, who had been mayor of the tiny town of Turtle River, Minnesota since 2007, died of pancreatic cancer at the age of 71.

2009 release of "Pretty Suzanne"
"Pretty Suzanne" was released as a single over 40 years after it was recorded. The B-side was "Monk Time". The song originated as a "time consumer" instrumental called "Paradox" composed by Eddie Shaw and Dave Day. The Monks' managers took notice and pushed them to take to a harder direction. "Pretty Suzanne" was first recorded in 1965 as a demo. This early 1967 recording was recorded at Tonstudio Pfanz near Hamburg. Martin Christoph of Red Lounge Records discovered a single sided acetate of the 1967 recording in 2007, and it later was released as a bonus track on the 2009 Light in the Attic reissue of Black Monk Time and as a single released by Red Lounge Records.

Legacy
Since the band's 1960s heyday, the influence of the Monks has grown steadily, beginning with krautrock then followed by successive generations of musicians in disparate genres such as punk rock, experimental, alternative and hip-hop, with acts such as the Dead Kennedys, the Beastie Boys, the White Stripes, the Fall and The Early Years exhibiting signs of their influence. Music historian Kelley Stoltz described the Monks in 1996 as a group that "overwhelms the listener with a sound they termed 'over-beat' - at their worst it is totally oddball freakrock that sounds like a pleasurable argument". Stoltz concluded the band was an innovative musical act which "outsexed the [Sex] Pistols" ten years before any other punk band emerged. In his book, The Rough Guide to Rock, writer Peter Buckley had said Black Monk Time has not "aged one iota. If anything, it has gotten stranger".

In 1994, Eddie Shaw published the autobiography Black Monk Time with help from his ex-wife Anita Klemke. Black Monk Time has been reissued on CD since the 1990s, and bonus tracks were included on the Light in the Attic Records release in 2009. Lenny Kaye featured "Complication" on the expanded reissue of the compilation album Nuggets: Original Artyfacts from the First Psychedelic Era, 1965–1968 in 1998. A tribute album, titled Silver Monk Time, containing tracks by numerous avant-garde bands, was released in October 2006 as the soundtrack to the award-winning documentary Monks: The Transatlantic Feedback.

Members 
Gary Burger - Lead guitar, lead vocalist, tambourine
Larry Clark (born Lawrence Spangler) - Organ, backing vocals, piano, tambourine
Eddie Shaw (born Thomas Edward Shaw) - Bass guitar, backing vocals, trumpet, brass instruments
Dave Day (born David Havlicek) - Banjo, rhythm guitar, banjo guitar, tambourine, backing vocals (Died: 2008)
Roger Johnston - Drums, backing vocals (Died: 2004)

Discography

Studio album

EP

Singles

Compilation albums

Live album

Tributes
The Fall covered "I Hate You" (re-titled "Black Monk Theme Part I" and "Oh, How To Do Now" (re-titled "Black Monk Theme Part II" on their 1990 album Extricate and "Shut Up" on their 1994 album  Middle Class Revolt
Silver Monk Time - A Tribute To The Monks (2006, Play Loud! Productions)
"Monk Time" b/w "Higgle-dy Piggle-dy" (2006, Play Loud! Productions) - a single from the above album
"Drunken Maria" b/w "Monk Chant" (2009, Play Loud! Productions) - a single from the above album
IDLES song and video "IDLES Chant" from their Meat EP (2015) - a tribute to "Monk Chant"

References
Notes

Bibliography

External links
The Monks Official Website

Monks article on Cult Cargo
"American GIs, Shaved Heads and Cold War Music History" Spiegel-International, February 7, 2007
Back to Monk Time Retrieved May 2, 2011
 Powerade ad (2000) featuring Monk Time

 
Beat groups
Musical groups established in 1964
Protopunk groups
Musical groups reestablished in 1999
United States Army soldiers
Polydor Records artists
Third Man Records artists
American garage rock groups